Bhoti Kinnauri (or Nyamkat, or the Nyam language) is a Tibetic language spoken in the Lahaul and Spiti region of Himachal Pradesh, India. It forms a closely knit group with other Lahuli–Spiti languages, and is fairly close to Standard Tibetan.

See also
 Bodh people

References

Bibliography

Languages of India
Bodish languages
Endangered languages of India